Anurida is a genus of Collembola belonging to the family Neanuridae.

The genus was first described by Laboulbène in 1865.

The genus has cosmopolitan distribution.

Species:
 Anurida granaria (Nicolet, 1847)

References

Collembola
Springtail genera